Augusta Henriques is an activist, educator and government minister from Guinea-Bissau, who in 2012 was the recipient of the Ramsar Wetland Conservation Award (Management).

In 1991 Henriques co-founded the non-governmental organisation Tiniguena, which campaigns for biodiversity action and community participation in Guinea-Bissau. She was also a founding trustee of the Foundation for Education with Production, a charity developed by Patrick van Rensberg. 

Henriques has represented the country internationally, including as representative to the International Union for Conservation of Nature (IUCN). She also worked in the Ministry of National Education as Head of Adult Education.

References

External links 

 Tiniguena ("this land is our land"): Augusta Henriques (film)

Year of birth missing (living people)
Bissau-Guinean women in politics
Bissau-Guinean activists
Living people